William Waugh may refer to:

Bill Waugh (born 1973), British field hockey player
Billy Waugh (born 1929), retired American Special Forces Sergeant Major and Central Intelligence Agency Paramilitary Operations Officer
William Waugh (football manager) (died 1921), Heart of Midlothian F.C. manager from 1903 to 1908
Willie Waugh (born 1910), Scottish football player
Billy Waugh (footballer) (1921–2009), former Scottish footballer